A seismogram is a graph output by a seismograph. It is a record of the ground motion at a measuring station as a function of time. Seismograms typically record motions in three cartesian axes (x, y, and z), with the z axis perpendicular to the Earth's surface and the x- and y- axes parallel to the surface. The energy measured in a seismogram may result from an earthquake or from some other source, such as an explosion. Seismograms can record many things, and record many little waves, called microseisms. These tiny microseisms can be caused by heavy traffic near the seismograph, waves hitting a beach, the wind, and any number of other ordinary things that cause some shaking of the seismograph. 

Historically, seismograms were recorded on paper attached to rotating drums, a kind of chart recorder. Some used pens on ordinary paper, while others used light beams to expose photosensitive paper. Today, practically all seismograms are recorded digitally to make analysis by computer easier. Some drum seismometers are still found, especially when used for public display. Seismograms are essential for finding the location and magnitude of earthquakes.

Recording

Prior to the availability of digital processing of seismic data in the late 1970s, the records were done in a few different forms on different types of media. 

A Helicorder drum is a device used to record data into photographic paper or in the form of paper and ink. A piece of paper is wrapped around a rotating drum of the helicorder which receives the seismic signal from a seismometer. For each predefined interval of data, the helicorder will plot the seismic data in one line before moving to the next line at the next interval. The paper must be changed after the helicorder writes on the last line of the paper. In the model that use ink, regular maintenance of the pen must be done for accurate recording.

A Develocorder is a machine that record multi-channels seismic data into a 16 mm film. The machine was developed by Teledyne Geotech during the mid 1960s. It can automatically plot seismograms from 18 seismic signal sources and 3 time signals on a continuous reel of film. The machine has self-contained circulating chemicals that are used to automatically develop the film. However, the machine takes at least ten minutes from time of recording to the time that the film can be viewed.

After the digital processing has been used, the archives of the seismograms were recorded in magnetic tapes. The data from the magnetic tapes can then be read back to reconstruct the original waveforms. Unfortunately, due to the deterioration of older magnetic tape medias, large number of waveforms from the archives in the early digital recording days are not recoverable. Today, many other forms are used to digitally record the seismograms into digital medias.

Reading 
Seismograms are read from left to right. 

Time marks show when the earthquake occurred. Time is shown by half-hour (thirty-minute) units. Each rotation of the seismograph drum is thirty minutes. Therefore, on seismograms, each line measures thirty minutes. This is a more efficient way to read a seismogram. Secondly, there are the minute-marks. A minute mark looks like a hyphen "-" between each minute. Minute marks count minutes on seismograms. From left to right, each mark stands for a minute.

Each seismic wave looks different.  The P-wave is the first wave that is bigger than the other waves (the microseisms). Because P waves are the fastest seismic waves, they will usually be the first ones that the seismograph records. The next set of seismic waves on the seismogram will be the S-waves. These are usually bigger than the P waves, and have higher frequency. Look for a dramatic change in frequency for a different type of wave.

See also 
 Vertical seismic profile
 First break picking
 Linear seismic inversion

References

External links
 How Do I Read a Seismogram? from Michigan Technological University
 REV, the Rapid Earthquake Viewer from the University of South Carolina

Seismology measurement